Shin'en Multimedia is a German Independent video game developer. Based in Munich, the company was founded in 1999 by former members of the demoscene group Abyss and is an official third-party developer for Nintendo. They develop games primarily for the Nintendo Switch, some non-Nintendo platforms such as the PlayStation 4, and previously for the Wii U, Wii, Nintendo 3DS, Nintendo DS, Game Boy Advance, and Game Boy Color.

In addition to developing games, Shin'en created the soundtracks for around 200 video games by other developers, and built the GHX, GAX, DSX, and NAX (which is based on the GAX) handheld audio middleware.

Their name is derived from the Japanese word 深淵 (shin'en, "abyss"), as a nod towards their original name.

Games

In addition, Shin'en has developed the audio of hundreds of games on Game Boy Color, Game Boy Advance, Nintendo DS, WiiWare and Nokia N-Gage as an outsourced audio developer, using their proprietary audio engines.

Notes

References

External links
Official Website

Video game companies established in 1999
German companies established in 1999
Video game companies of Germany
Video game development companies
Companies based in Munich